March 2014

See also

References

 03
March 2014 events in the United States